Convoy HG 73 was a trade convoy of merchant ships during the Second World War. It was the 73rd of the numbered HG convoys Homeward bound to the British Isles from Gibraltar. The convoy departed Gibraltar on 17 September 1941 and was found on 18 September and was attacked over the next ten days. Nine ships were sunk from the convoy before the submarines exhausted their torpedo inventory on 28 September. Surviving ships reached Liverpool on 1 October.

Forces involved
HG 73 comprised 25 ships homeward bound from Gibraltar, many in ballast, or carrying trade goods.
The convoy commodore was Rear admiral. K.E.L Creighton in the cargo liner Avoceta 
and the convoy was protected by a Western Approaches Command escort group. This consisted of the sloop HMS Fowey and eight corvettes, reinforced by the auxiliary anti-aircraft cruiser/Fighter catapult ship HMS Springbank. The convoy escort was augmented during the first few days by the destroyers Duncan, Vimy and  Farndale, and was reinforced at various times throughout the voyage as warships came and went.

Ranged against HG 73 was an ad hoc wolfpack of five U-boats (U-124, U-201, U-203, U-205, and U-371), in concert with a group of four Italian submarines (Da Vinci, Malaspina, Morosini and Torelli) on patrol west of the Straits of Gibraltar. They were assisted by aircraft from Kampfgeschwader 40 (KG40), flying long-range Fw 200 Condors, based at Bordeaux.

Action
HG 73 sailed from Gibraltar on 17 September 1941, and was reported almost immediately by German agents across the bay in neutral Spain; these were able to report the convoy's composition, escort strength and departure time.

The Condors from KG40 and the four Italian submarines (unbeknownst to Befehlshaber der U-Boote "U-boat Command" (BdU) one of these, Malaspina, had already been destroyed the previous week) were ordered to search for the convoy, while three U-boats further north were deployed in a search patrol line across the convoy's probable route.

On 18 September a Condor sighted HG 73 off Cape St Vincent, but this was driven off by the Fulmar launched from Springbank.

On 19 September the convoy was sighted again, first by Morosini, and later by U-371, though both lost contact; Morosini fell out of the pursuit with engine trouble, while U-371, en route to the Mediterranean, was ordered to continue on her way.

On 20 September the destroyers Duncan and Farndale departed, but were replaced by destroyer Wild Swan.

Also on 20 September U-124 made contact, but this proved to be a southbound convoy, OG 74. Unaware of this, BdU ordered U-201 to join her and over the next two days and nights both U-boats attacked OG 74, succeeding in sinking five ships, though both received damage and depleted their store of torpedoes.

Meanwhile, HG 73 was attacked by the Italian boats, though without success: On the night of 21/22 September Vimy made a promising attack on a contact, and was later credited with the destruction of Malaspina, though it was later suggested this attack had been on Torelli, which survived, but was badly damaged and forced to return to base.

On 22 September the two destroyers, Vimy and Wild Swan, left the escort, replaced by destroyer Highlander.

On 23 September Da Vinci made contact, and shadowed the convoy throughout the day, but was unable to make an attack.

On 24 September a Condor spotted the convoy and reported three ships on fire, though British records show no ships hit. BdU diverted two more U-boats (U-203 and U-205) to the attack from France; these arrived over the next two days .

On 25 September U-124 made contact in heavy seas and fired on a ship identified as a cruiser; this may have been Springbank, but no hits were achieved, and no attack was noticed by any Allied ship.
That night U-203 joined, and both U-boats attacked, scoring several hits. Just after midnight U-203 sank Avoceta and Varengberg, but came under attack from the corvette Larkspur.
A few hours later U-124 sank Cortes and Petrel. The coaster, Lapwing, stopped to pick up survivors from these two ships, but was herself torpedoed just before dawn. Of the 109 men on these three ships only 18 men survived, reaching land after a two-week voyage in an open lifeboat.

On 26 September,  Highlander departed from the escort, while U-124 and U-203 continued to shadow. U-201 and U-205 also joined, but during the day U-205 was attacked by an Allied aircraft; she was damaged and forced to return to base.

During the night of 26/27 September the three U-boats in contact attacked again; just before midnight U-124 sank Siremalm, while at 2am U-201 torpedoed and sank Cervantes and torpedoed Springbank. Springbanks survivors were taken off and Jasmine sank Springbank with gunfire rather than leave her as a hazard.

During 27 September the three boats continued to shadow, and that night U-201 made a final attack, sinking Margareta; neither U-124 nor U-203 were able to attack again.

With this the pursuing U-boats were obliged to abandon the operation, and return to base to re-arm. HG 73 was left to continue without further incident, arriving at Liverpool on 1 October.

Aftermath
Despite the best efforts of the escort force, of the 25 ships that departed Gibraltar nine were lost, and one escort vessel, making this the worst loss of any HG convoy, and one of the worst of the entire Atlantic campaign.
Of the 117 convoys of the HG series run during the three years between September 1939 and September 1942, thirteen (just over one in ten) were attacked: Of the 2994 ships conveyed, 55 (approximately one in twenty) were lost; 39 to attacks on convoys, such as this one, and a further 16 losses out of convoy.

The operation was a victory for the attacking forces, though the successes claimed were inflated considerably. The three U-boat commanders were credited with sinking 15 ships, of 91,000 GRT, while the three ships spotted sinking on 24 September were credited to Malaspina, which had failed to return, and was thus unable to report otherwise. The actual tonnage of the nine ships sunk was 25,800 GRT; the discrepancy is attributable to the generally smaller coasters of the Gibraltar route being misidentified as larger, ocean-going freighters. 
It was, however, the high point of Axis success on the Gibraltar route; just two months later the losses incurred attacking HG 76 forced BdU to abandon operations here in favour of softer targets elsewhere.

Ships in the convoy

Allied merchant ships
A total of 25 merchant vessels joined the convoy in Gibraltar.

Convoy escorts
A series of armed military ships escorted the convoy at various times during its journey.

References

Bibliography

External links
HG.73 at convoyweb
Convoy HG 73 at uboat.net

North Atlantic convoys of World War II
C